Nebraska Highway 33 is a highway in Nebraska. It has a western terminus at U.S. Highway 6 and Nebraska Highway 15 west of Dorchester and an eastern terminus near Roca with U.S. Highway 77 and Nebraska Spur 55F.

Route description
Nebraska Highway 33 begins west of Dorchester at U.S. Highway 6 and Nebraska Highway 15. It runs at a southeasterly angle parallel to BNSF railroad tracks through farmland. It passes through Dorchester, then continues southeast until an intersection with Nebraska Highway 103. NE 33 and NE 103 overlap through Crete and goes northeasterly. They separate northeast of Crete. The eastern terminus of NE 33 is also the western terminus of Nebraska Spur 55F.

Major intersections

References

External links

Nebraska Roads: NE 21-40

033
Transportation in Saline County, Nebraska
Transportation in Lancaster County, Nebraska